Kevin Manthei (born 1970 in Maplewood, Minnesota) is an American composer for film, television, and video games.

Biography
Manthei grew up in Minnesota. He played the piano in his youth and played the trumpet in high school. He graduated from the University of Minnesota with a Bachelor of Music degree in Theory and Composition. He also studied at the University of Southern California under Jerry Goldsmith. He has collaborated with other graduates of the program, Christophe Beck and Marco Beltrami, writing additional music for Beck on the TV series Buffy the Vampire Slayer and other shows, and composing additional music for Beltrami on films including  Scream 2, Scream 3, The Faculty, Scary Movie 2 and Resident Evil.

Manthei began his game writing career working on titles such as Panzer General II, Vampire: The Masquerade - Redemption, Sacrifice, Wizardry 8, Twisted Metal: Black. His other work on video game titles includes Kung Fu Panda, Marvel Universe Online, Upshift Strikeracer, Xiaolin Showdown, Ultimate Spider-Man, City of Villains, The Sims 2, StarCraft: Ghost, Shrek 2, Silent Hunter II, and Shark Tale.

For his work on Invader Zim, Manthei received an Annie Award nomination for Outstanding Achievement in Music for an animated series. Invader Zim also led to Xiaolin Showdown for Warner Bros. Animation as well as Brandy & Mr. Whiskers for Disney. In scoring with Warner Bros' television series Johnny Test, he wrote the emo punk-inspired main title and score to the first season. Manthei also created music for shows like Cartoon Network's Generator Rex and Adult Swim's Robot Chicken.

Manthei has also worked on scores for independent filmmakers such as The 24th Day. He wrote the music for the feature films Justice League: The New Frontier and Batman: Gotham Knight and scored the animated series Ultimate Spider-Man.

Scores

Film projects

Television projects

Video game projects

References

Visions in Sound - Batman Gotham Knight Interview
Annie Awards Red Carpet Interview
Film Score Monthly Interview
Comicus - Batman: Gotham Knight Interview
SyFy Radio - Justice League: New Frontier Interview
Visions in Sound Interview
Kevin Manthei and Dan Spitz Interview 1
Kevin Manthei and Dan Spitz Interview 2
Kevin Manthei Interview
Shrek 2 Score Interview
StarCraft: Ghost Interview

External links 
Kevin Manthei's Official Site

Living people
University of Minnesota College of Liberal Arts alumni
American film score composers
1970 births
La-La Land Records artists